Abdul Sheriff is a Tanzanian emeritus history professor at the University of Dar es Salaam, and former director of the Peace Memorial Museum, the national museum of Zanzibar.

Life 
Sheriff was born on December 7, 1939, on the island of Zanzibar. He was able to study with scholarships of the African Scholarship Program of American Universities and the African-American Institute. He obtained his bachelor's degree in geography in 1964 at the University of California, Los Angeles, as well as his Master's degree in history in 1966. At the School of Oriental and African Studies in London he obtained his Ph.D. in 1971 on the basis of his research on the history of Africa.

Since 1969 he taught at the University of Dar es Salaam. From 1977 to 1979 he led the faculty of history as an associate professor, and chaired the historical society of Tanzania. In 1980, he was appointed as a professor at the university until 1996. Furthermore, he was visiting professor at universities in Berlin, Lisbon, Bergen, Montreal and Minnesota.

Important fields for Sheriff have been the research of the Dhow culture of the Indian Ocean, the history and culture of Zanzibar, and the history and conservation of Stone Town, the old city district of Zanzibar. He has applied his knowledge in the restoration of the ceremonial palace of the sultan. In order to effectuate this restoration, he specially trained a local scientific team. Furthermore, he founded the House of Wonders as a national historic and cultural museum of Zanzibar and the coast of Swahili.

In 2005, Sheriff was honored with a Prince Claus Award from the Netherlands for the crucial role he played in the conservation of the cultural heritage of Zanzibar. The following year he was rewarded with a Zeze Award of the Tanzanian Fund for Culture, and in 2007 with the Maxwell Cummings Distinguished Lectureship of the McGill University.

Bibliography 
1987: Slaves Spices & Ivory Zanzibar: Integration Of An East African Commercial, Ohio University Press, 
1991: Zanzibar Under Colonial Rule: Eastern African Studies, met Ed Ferguson, Ohio University Press, 
1995: Historical Zanzibar, met Javed Jafferji & Ashter Chomoko, Hsp Publications, 
1995: Zanzibar Chroniques Du Passe, HSP Publications, 
1995: Historical Zanzibar: Romance of the Ages, HSP Publications, 
1995: History & Conservation Of Zanzibar Stone Town, Ohio University Press, 
1998: Zanzibar stone town : an architectural exploration, met Zarina Jafferji, Gallery Publications, ASIN B007ERZZVG
2001: Zanzibar Stone Town, met Zarina Jafferji, Galley Publications, 
2006: The Zanzibar House of Wonders Museum: Self-reliance and Partnership, A Case Study in Culture and Development, met Paul Klooft & Mubiana Luhila, KIT Publishers Amsterdam, 
2010: Dhow Cultures and the Indian Ocean: Cosmopolitanism, Commerce, and Islam, KIT Publishers Amsterdam,

References

External links 
Sheriff, Abdul (2006) Culture is the fountain of our progress , The Power of Culture

Academic staff of the University of Dar es Salaam
Museum directors
Historians of Africa
Living people
1939 births
People from Mjini Magharibi Region